Cumulonimbus is a dense, towering vertical cloud, typically forming from water vapor condensing in the lower troposphere that builds upward carried by powerful buoyant air currents. Above the lower portions of the cumulonimbus the water vapor becomes ice crystals, such as snow and graupel, the interaction of which can lead to hail and to lightning formation, respectively. When occurring as a thunderstorm these clouds may be referred to as thunderheads. Cumulonimbus can form alone, in clusters, or along squall lines. These clouds are capable of producing lightning and other dangerous severe weather, such as tornadoes, hazardous winds, and large hailstones. Cumulonimbus progress from overdeveloped cumulus congestus clouds and may further develop as part of a supercell. Cumulonimbus is abbreviated Cb.

Appearance 

Towering cumulonimbus clouds are typically accompanied by smaller cumulus clouds. Well-developed cumulonimbus clouds are characterized by a flat, anvil-like top (anvil dome), caused by wind shear or inversion at the equilibrium level near the tropopause. The shelf of the anvil may precede the main cloud's vertical component for many kilometres (miles), and be accompanied by lightning. Occasionally, rising air parcels surpass the equilibrium level (due to momentum) and form an overshooting top culminating at the maximum parcel level. When vertically developed, this largest of all clouds usually extends through all three cloud regions. Even the smallest cumulonimbus cloud dwarfs its neighbors in comparison.

Species 
 Cumulonimbus calvus: cloud with puffy top, similar to cumulus congestus which it develops from; under the correct conditions it can become a cumulonimbus capillatus.
 Cumulonimbus capillatus: cloud with cirrus-like, fibrous-edged top.

Types 
 Cumulonimbus flammagenitus (pyrocumulonimbus): rapidly growing cloud forming from non-atmospheric heat and condensation nuclei sources such wildfires and volcanic eruptions.

Supplementary features

Accessory clouds
 Arcus (including roll and shelf clouds): low, horizontal cloud formation associated with the leading edge of thunderstorm outflow.
 Pannus: accompanied by a lower layer of fractus species cloud forming in precipitation.
 Pileus (species calvus only): small cap-like cloud over parent cumulonimbus.
 Velum: a thin horizontal sheet that forms around the middle of a cumulonimbus.

Supplementary features
 Incus (species capillatus only): cumulonimbus with flat anvil-like cirriform top caused by wind shear where the rising air currents hit the inversion layer at the tropopause.
 Mamma or mammatus: consisting of bubble-like protrusions on the underside.
 Tuba: column hanging from the cloud base which can develop into a funnel cloud or tornado.
 Flanking line is a line of small cumulonimbus or cumulus generally associated with severe thunderstorms.
 An overshooting top is a dome that rises above the thunderstorm; it is associated with severe weather.

Precipitation-based supplementary features
 Rain: precipitation that reaches the ground as liquid, often in a precipitation shaft.
 Virga: precipitation that evaporates before reaching the ground.

Effects 

Cumulonimbus storm cells can produce torrential rain of a convective nature (often in the form of a rain shaft) and flash flooding, as well as straight-line winds. Most storm cells die after about 20 minutes, when the precipitation causes more downdraft than updraft, causing the energy to dissipate. If there is sufficient instability and moisture in the atmosphere, however (on a hot summer day, for example), the outflowing moisture and gusts from one storm cell can lead to new cells forming just a few kilometres (miles) from the former one a few tens of minutes later or in some cases hundreds of kilometres (miles) away many hours later. This process cause thunderstorm formation (and decay) to last for several hours or even over multiple days. Cumulonimbus clouds can also occur as a dangerous winter storms called "thundersnow" which are associated with particularly intense snowfall rates and with blizzard conditions when accompanied by strong winds that further reduce visibility. However, cumulonimbus clouds are most common in tropical regions and are also frequent in moist environments during the warm season in the middle latitudes. A dust storm caused by a cumulonimbus downburst is a haboob.

Hazards to aviation 
Cumulonimbus are a notable hazard to aviation due most importantly to potent wind currents but also reduced visibility and lightning, as well as icing and hail if flying inside the cloud. Within and in the vicinity of thunderstorms there is significant turbulence and clear-air turbulence (particularly downwind), respectively. Wind shear within and under a cumulonimbus is often intense with downbursts being responsible for many accidents in earlier decades before training and technological detection and nowcasting measures were implemented. A small form of downburst, the microburst, is the most often implicated in crashes because of their rapid onset and swift changes in wind and aerodynamic conditions over short distances. Most downbursts are associated with visible precipitation shafts, however, dry microbursts are generally invisible to the naked eye. At least one fatal commercial airline accident was associated with flying through a tornado.

Life cycle or stages 

In general, cumulonimbus require moisture, an unstable air mass, and a lifting force in order to form. Cumulonimbus typically go through three stages: the developing stage, the mature stage (where the main cloud may reach supercell status in favorable conditions), and the dissipation stage. Depending on the conditions present in the atmosphere, these three stages take an average of 30 minutes to go through.

Cloud types 

Clouds form when the dew point temperature of water is reached in the presence of condensation nuclei in the troposphere. The atmosphere is a dynamic system, and the local conditions of turbulence, uplift, and other parameters give rise to many types of clouds. Various types of cloud occur frequently enough to have been categorized. Furthermore, some atmospheric processes can make the clouds organize in distinct patterns such as wave clouds or actinoform clouds. These are large-scale structures and are not always readily identifiable from a single point of view.

See also 

 Atmospheric convection
 Atmospheric thermodynamics
 Convective instability
 Hot tower
 Lifted condensation level (LCL), convective condensation level (CCL), level of free convection (LFC), and free convective layer (FCL)
 William Rankin
 Ewa Wiśnierska

References

External links 

 Clouds-Online.com Cloud Atlas with many photos and description of the different cloud genera
 MetOffice.gov.uk Learn about thunderstorms and how cumulonimbus clouds form 

Cirrus
Cumulus
Severe weather and convection